Argan (Argania spinosa) is a tree of North Africa.

Argan may also refer to:

 Argan oil, produced from the tree above
 Argania (moth), a genus of moths of the family Erebidae
 Argan (grape), another name for the European wine grape Argant
 Argan, the protagonist of Le Malade imaginaire
 Giulio Carlo Argan (1909–1992), Italian art historian and politician
 The Sasanian city Arrajan